Belemite was a term used during the Napoleonic Wars by English troops to describe an officer who shirked his duty, preferring to remain safely behind the lines. Belém, outside of Lisbon, was the location of a convent used by the army as a hospital. Charles Oman in his 1912 “Wellington's Army, 1809–1814” describes,

References

Napoleonic Wars